Benjamin Elbel (16 March 1690 – 4 June 1756) was a German Franciscan moral theologian.

Elbel was born at Friedberg, Bavaria.  He belonged to the Strasburg Franciscan province, was lector of theology, and held high positions in the order.  He died at Söflingen.

Works

His major work, "Theologia moralis decalogalis et sacramentalis" (Venice, 1731), passed rapidly through several editions. A new edition was prepared by Irenaeus Bierbaum, O.F.M., under the title "Theologia moralis per modum conferentiarum auctore clarissime P. Benjamin Elbel..." (3 vols., Paderborn, 1891–92).

Elbel advocated probabilism. He applied abstract principles to strikingly practical cases, and his approach proved influential.

References

Attribution
 The entry cites:
Hurter, Nomenclator lit., IV (3rd ed.), 1635;
Eubel, Geschichte der oberdeutschen Minoritenprovinz (Wurzburg, 1886);
Preface to Bierbaum's edition (mentioned above)

1690 births
1756 deaths
German Friars Minor
18th-century German Catholic theologians
German male non-fiction writers
18th-century German writers
18th-century German male writers